Argideen Rangers is a Gaelic football and Hurling club based in Timoleague in County Cork, Republic of Ireland. In 2005 the club won the Cork Intermediate Hurling Championship by beating Nemo Rangers in the final.
The club plays in the Carbery GAA (South West Cork) division of Cork competitions.

History

Back in 1892, a club in the area known as St Molaga's contested the West Cork football final. Only three clubs participated in the championship. The club was strong in the early years of the association. This was due in no small way to the establishment of the railway network in the area and the work of John Burke, a railway employee based in Timoleague. It went into decline for a while but reemerged in the 1930s, reaching the west cork Junior 'B' hurling final in 1933. They went one better the following year, winning the 'A' title when Bandon was defeated. The club took a back seat again for a while and success came with Argideen Rovers minor footballers winning back to back West-Cork titles in 1964 and '65. In 1967 the junior 2 football title was won along with a league trophy.

In 1979 the underage club was re-organised and the modern era of Timoleague G.A.A. took root. Starting at under 14, all competitions at under 14 and under 16 in both hurling and football in West-Cork were won, along with contesting two county finals in hurling. The breakthrough at adult level came in 1985 with success in Junior '2' Hurling. Two years later, West-Cork titles in under 21 hurling and Junior '2' football were won. The big breakthrough was made in 1993 when the Flyer Nyhan Cup was won. West-Cork and County Titles in Junior '2' were also added that year. 1994 was a remarkable year for the club. Argideen and Barryroe met in both finals with Barryroe winning the Hurling and Argideen scoring their first success in the football decider. Barry Harte, current manager of the Argideen Rangers Hurling team, captained Carbery to their first ever County Senior Hurling title. The Timoleague club also provided Tony Crowley and Mark Foley to his team along with selector Edward McSweeney. 1996 saw the County Junior 'A' hurling title coming to the village for the first time when Fr. O'Neill’s were defeated. Intermediate hurling followed for the next five years with occasional success when the scalps of Éire Óg, Glen Rovers, Blarney, Aghada and Milford were taken. The club re-graded to Junior in 2002 but bounced back with a West-Cork title in 2003. After two great games with Grenagh, Argideen reached the county final but had to give way to Dromina. The club was promoted to intermediate grade after their great run and once more found themselves in a county final in 2005 - this time at intermediate, where they defeated Nemo Rangers to gain promotion to Premier Intermediate status.

Honours
 Intermediate A County Hurling Winner (1) 2005
 West Cork Junior A Hurling Championship Winner  (3) 1993, 1996 and 2003
 West Cork Junior A Football Championship Winner (1) 1994
 West Cork Junior B Hurling Championship Winner (1) 1985
 West Cork Junior B Football Championship Winner  (4) 1967, 1988, 1993 and 2001.
 West Cork Junior C Hurling Championship Winner (1) 2014  Runner-Up 2015
 Cork Junior Hurling Championship: Winners (1) 1996, Runners-Up: 2003
In 2003 the club was promoted to compete in the Cork Intermediate Hurling Championship even though it had not won the county Junior Hurling Competition.
 Cork Junior B Football Championship: Winners (4) 1993, 2001, 2008, 2017
 Cork Under-21 B Football Championship(1): 2016 (as Ibane gaels)  
 West Cork Under-21 Hurling Championship Winners (2) 1987, 2007
 Cork Minor B Hurling Championship (0): (Runners-Up 2022) (as Ibane gaels)
 Cork Minor B Football Championship: Runners Up 1992
 Cork Minor C Hurling Championship: Runners Up 2006

Notable players
 Mark Foley

References

External links
Official Argideen Rangers website

Gaelic games clubs in County Cork
Hurling clubs in County Cork
Gaelic football clubs in County Cork